The 1954 United States Senate election in Minnesota took place on November 2, 1954. Incumbent Democratic U.S. Senator Hubert H. Humphrey defeated Republican Minnesota State Treasurer Val Bjornson, to win a second term.

Democratic–Farmer–Labor primary

Candidates

Declared
 A. B. Gilbert
 Hubert H. Humphrey, Incumbent U.S. Senator since 1949
 Harold Strom

Results

Republican primary

Candidates

Declared
 Val Bjornson, Minnesota State Treasurer since 1951
 Arthur D. Russell
 Richard S. (Dick) Wilcox

Results

General election

Results

See also 
 United States Senate elections, 1954

References

Minnesota
1954
1954 Minnesota elections
Hubert Humphrey